Ömirbek Bäigeldi (Ömırbek Bäigeldı; born 15 April 1939) is a retired Kazakh politician who was a member of the Senate of Kazakhstan where he served as the Chair from 30 January 1996 to 29 November 1999 and then its Deputy Chair from 1 December 1999 to 1 December 2005. Prior to that, Baigeldi was the Head of the Jambyl Region from 1992 to 1995.

Biography

Early life and education 
Baigeldi was born in the village of Ernazar in Jambyl Region. In 1962, he graduated from the Kazakh National Agrarian University as livestock scientist. In 1982, Baigeldi earned his political science degree from the Academy of Sciences of the Soviet Union.

Career 
After graduating in 1962, he was engaged in scientific and practical activities in the field of organization and management of agriculture and industry where he published a collection of articles and reports. From 1975 to 1990, Baigeldi was the head of the Regional Committee Department, First Secretary of the Kordai District Party Committee, chairman of the Executive Committee of the Jambyl Regional Council of People's Deputies, and the First Secretary of the Jambyl Regional Committee of the QKP. 

On 12 February 1992, Baigeldi was appointed as the Head of Jambyl Region. Shortly after he became the advisor to the President of Kazakhstan in October 1995. On 5 December 1995, Baigeldi was elected as a Senator from Jambyl Region and was chosen as its Chair on 30 January 1996. From 1 December 1999, he served as Deputy Chair of the Senate until he was replaced by Muhambet Kopeev on 1 December 2005. Baigeldi continued serving as a Senator until August 2011.

Award 
Honor of the Republic of Uzbekistan (May 26, 1994, Uzbekistan) — for selfless work and high professional skills, manifested in the preparation and holding of days of the Republic of Kazakhstan in Uzbekistan.

Memorable jubilee sign “Manas-1000” (31 August 1995, Kyrgyzstan) — for active assistance in the preparation and celebration of the 1000th anniversary of the Epos “Manas” and a great contribution to the strengthening of friendship between the peoples of Kazakhstan and Kyrgyzstan.

Othan Order (August 27, 1999) — For merits to the Republic of Kazakhstan, a significant contribution to the formation and development of Kazakhstan legislation, the development and implementation of constitutional reforms.

Order “Commonwealth” (MPA CIS) (2001) for a special contribution to the development of parliamentarism, strengthening democracy, ensuring the rights and freedoms of citizens in the CIS member states.

Honor of the Senate of the Parliament of the Republic of Kazakhstan (2019) — for a great personal contribution to the development of parliamentarism and legislative activities.

The title “Honorary Cordan district of the Zhambyl region” (August 11, 2002) — for a significant contribution to the socio-economic development of the area.

The title “Honorary Citizen of the Zhambyl Region” (2002) — for merits in front of the region.

The honorary title “Kazakhstan Eңbek Sіңіrgen қairatkerі” (Honored Worker of Kazakhstan) (2009) — for a great contribution to the socio-economic cultural and political development of independent Kazakhstan.

References 

1939 births
Living people
People from Jambyl Region
Members of the Senate of Kazakhstan
Recipients of the Order of Friendship of Peoples
Recipients of the Order of Kurmet
Recipients of the Order of the Red Banner of Labour
20th-century Kazakhstani politicians
21st-century Kazakhstani politicians